This is a year-by-year list of every Kentucky Wildcats football team quarterback and the years they participated on the Kentucky Wildcats football team.

Starting Quarterbacks

1933 to present 

The following players were the predominant quarterbacks for the Wildcats each season after the establishment of the Southeastern Conference.

Key

1922 to 1932

The following players were the predominant quarterbacks for the Wildcats each season after the establishment of the Southern Conference until the establishment of the Southeastern Conference.

1896 to 1921 (incomplete)

The following players were the predominant quarterbacks for the Wildcats each season after the establishment of the Southern Intercollegiate Athletic Association until the establishment of the Southern Conference.

References

Lists of college football quarterbacks
Kentucky Wildcats quarterbacks